In algebra, the zero-product property states that the product of two nonzero elements is nonzero. In other words, 

This property is also known as the rule of zero product, the null factor law, the multiplication property of zero, the nonexistence of nontrivial zero divisors, or one of the two zero-factor properties.  All of the number systems studied in elementary mathematics — the integers , the rational numbers , the real numbers , and the complex numbers  — satisfy the zero-product property.  In general, a ring which satisfies the zero-product property is called a domain.

Algebraic context

Suppose  is an algebraic structure.  We might ask, does  have the zero-product property?  In order for this question to have meaning,  must have both additive structure and multiplicative structure.  Usually one assumes that  is a ring, though it could be something else, e.g. the set of nonnegative integers  with ordinary addition and multiplication, which is only a (commutative) semiring.

Examples
 A ring in which the zero-product property holds is called a domain.  A commutative domain with a multiplicative identity element is called an integral domain.  Any field is an integral domain; in fact, any subring of a field is an integral domain (as long as it contains 1).  Similarly, any subring of a skew field is a domain.  Thus, the zero-product property holds for any subring of a skew field.
 If  is a prime number, then the ring of integers modulo  has the zero-product property (in fact, it is a field).
 The Gaussian integers are an integral domain because they are a subring of the complex numbers.
 In the strictly skew field of quaternions, the zero-product property holds. This ring is not an integral domain, because the multiplication is not commutative.
 The set of nonnegative integers  is not a ring (being instead a semiring), but it does satisfy the zero-product property.

Non-examples

 Let  denote the ring of integers modulo . Then  does not satisfy the zero product property: 2 and 3 are nonzero elements, yet .
 In general, if  is a composite number, then  does not satisfy the zero-product property.
 The ring  of 2×2 matrices with integer entries does not satisfy the zero-product property: if  and  then  yet neither  nor  is zero.
 The ring of all functions , from the unit interval to the real numbers, has nontrivial zero divisors: there are pairs of functions which are not identically equal to zero yet whose product is the zero function.  In fact, it is not hard to construct, for any n ≥ 2, functions , none of which is identically zero, such that  is identically zero whenever .
 The same is true even if we consider only continuous functions, or only even infinitely smooth functions. On the other hand, analytic functions have the zero-product property.

Application to finding roots of polynomials

Thus, one can use factorization to find the roots of a polynomial.

Suppose also that  has  distinct roots . In particular,  has at most  distinct roots.

If however  is not an integral domain, then the conclusion need not hold.

See also
 Fundamental theorem of algebra
 Integral domain and domain
 Prime ideal
 Zero divisor

Notes

References
David S. Dummit and Richard M. Foote, Abstract Algebra (3d ed.), Wiley, 2003, .

External links
 PlanetMath: Zero rule of product

Abstract algebra
Elementary algebra
Real analysis
Ring theory
0 (number)